Saiful Rijal (also Saiful Rehal, Saiful Rizal) was the seventh Sultan of Brunei. He ruled from 1533, from the abdication of his uncle, until his death in 1581. During his reign, the Castille War broke out in 1578. He was succeeded by his eldest son Shah Berunai. The Sultan was also known as Lixar and Sultan Nula Alan by the Spaniards.

See also
 List of Sultans of Brunei

References

1581 deaths
16th-century Sultans of Brunei
Year of birth unknown